Massa Marittima Cathedral (Cattedrale di San Cerbone) is a Roman Catholic cathedral in Massa Marittima, Tuscany, Italy, dedicated to Saint Cerbonius. Formerly the episcopal seat of the Diocese of Massa Marittima, it is now that of the Diocese of Massa Marittima-Piombino.

Architecture

The façade reveals the different influences which inspired the anonymous architect: the blind arcades in the lower part, decorated with circular openings and lozenges, the loggiato in the middle part and the surmounting tympanum are in Pisan Romanesque style. The large ogival mullioned window and the three spires show instead a Sienese influence.

The central portal flanked by two lion columns has five panels dating from the early 13th century illustrating the legend of Saint Cerbonius. The three central columns of the tympanum rest on three figures: a bearded man, a griffin and a horse.

The bell tower is the original 13th-century one in the lower part while the upper area is a 19th-century addition.

Interior
The interior has a basilica plan with an apse and two aisles, divided by cylindrical columns and cruciform pilasters which end in complex composite capitals. Next to the entrance door, under the 14th century triptych of the Madonna Enthroned with Child and Saints, is a Roman sarcophagus from the 4th century. On the right of the counter-façade is a series of panels in soft stone, dating from the High Middle Ages or, according to some sources, to the 12th-13th century. Over the panels are frescoes of the Crucifixion, of the 14th century, and the legend of Saint Julian, of the 15th century.

The central rose window has rare stained glass of the Sienese School. On the left is the monumental baptismal font, with a rectangular bath surmounted by a small temple. The baptistery dates from 1267.

The south aisle houses paintings/sculptures of the Madonna in Glory by Antonio Nasini (late 17th century) and  the Nativity of the Virgin by Rutilio Manetti (16th century). In the chapel on the right of the presbytery is a painted cross by Segna di Bonaventura (14th century). The wooden pulpit is of the 17th century. Also by Rutilio Manetti are the paintings/sculptures of the Immaculate Conception and the Eternal Father in the chapel to the right of the major one.

The high altar, in marble (1626), has a polychrome wooden crucifix by Giovanni Pisano (early 14th century). At the foot of the altar are two wooden angels from the 15th century, by Domenico di Niccolò dei Cori. Behind it is the Ark of Saint Cerbonius, which was created in 1342, with reliefs depicting stories of the saint.

On the right wall is a 15th-century fresco of Saint Cerbonius Accompanied by Ducks, while a Maestà attributed to Duccio di Buoninsegna (1316) can be seen in the chapel to the left of the major one, together with an Annunciation by Raffaello Vanni (17th century).

The crypt houses small statues of prophets and saints by an unknown mid-14th-century Sienese sculptor, and a 15th-century fresco, Crucifixion with Saint Cerbonius and Saint Bonaventura of Siena.

Sources

External links
Massa Marittima Cathedral interiors

Romanesque architecture in Tuscany
Churches in the province of Grosseto
Roman Catholic churches in Tuscany
Massa Marittima
Cathedrals in Tuscany
Massa Marittima